Topolje  may refer to:

 Topolje, Slovenia, a village near Železniki
 Topolje, Osijek-Baranja County, a village near Draž in Croatian Baranja
 Topolje, Zagreb County, a village near Ivanić-Grad, Croatia